The Good Shepherd Schools  is a multi-campus school comprising nursery, primary, and secondary school.

It is located in Lagos, Nigeria.

The Ketu annex was established in 1993 and its 13th year valedictory service was held in 2011.

References

Boarding schools in Nigeria
Private schools in Nigeria
Secondary schools in Nigeria